Xystrocerini is a tribe of longhorn beetles in the subfamily Cerambycinae, erected by Blanchard in 1845.

Genera

The following are included in BioLib.cz:

 Addoeme Adlbauer, 1998
 Afroeme Adlbauer, 2004
 Afromethia Adlbauer, 2000
 Afronoserius Sama, 2008
 Amimes Pascoe, 1862
 Amphelissoeme Martins, 1981
 Amplilygrus Adlbauer, 2004
 Androeme Aurivillius, 1910
 Antennoeme Hintz, 1911
 Aponoeme Martins, 1985
 Argentinoeme Bruch, 1911
 Atenizus Bates, 1867
 Austroeme Martins, Chemsak & Linsley, 1966
 Auxesis Thomson, 1858
 Calybistum Thomson, 1878
 Capezoum Adlbauer, 2003
 Capoeme Adlbauer, 2008
 Catoeme Aurivillius, 1908
 Chromoeme Chemsak & Linsley, 1967
 Cilioeme Adlbauer, 2006
 Coleomethia Linsley, 1940
 Coptoeme Aurivillius, 1903
 Corioeme Adlbauer, 2006
 Cyanomethia Philips & Ivie, 1998
 Cylindroeme Vives, 2019
 Diptychoeme Aurivillius, 1914
 Dorjia Holzschuh, 1989
 Elegantometallyra Adlbauer, 2004
 Enicoeme Aurivillius, 1915
 Entetraommatus Fisher, 1940
 Ethiolygrus Adlbauer, 2008
 Etiosaphanus Adlbauer, 1999
 Eudistenia Fall, 1907
 Euryprosopus White, 1853
 Fragiliella Holzschuh, 2013
 Gabunsaphanidus Adlbauer, 2006
 Gennarus Adlbauer, 2008
 Gounelleoeme Monné & Martins, 1974
 Haplidoeme Chemsak & Linsley, 1965
 Heterosaphanus Aurivillius, 1914
 Hyphus Lacordaire, 1869
 Hypoeschrus J. Thomson, 1864
 Isosaphanodes Breuning, 1958
 Isosaphanus Hintz, 1913
 Jendekia Holzschuh, 1993
 Kabatekiella Holzschuh, 2008
 Kalore Martins & Galileo, 2006
 Kenyoeme Quentin & Villiers, 1979
 Leptoeme Jordan, 1903
 Leptoxenus Bates, 1877
 Liberedaxia Alten, Alten & Ramey, 2009
 Limernaea Thomson, 1878
 Listrocerum Chevrolat, 1855
 Macroeme Aurivillius, 1893
 Madecassometallyra Lepesme & Breuning, 1956
 Malacopterus Audinet-Serville, 1833
 Martinsia Chemsak & Linsley, 1967
 Meiyingia Holzschuh, 2010
 Metalloeme Touroult, Dalens & Tavakilian, 2010
 Metallyra Thomson, 1864
 Methia Newman, 1842
 Methicula Chemsak & Linsley, 1971
 Methioeme Zajciw, 1963
 Methioides Chemsak & Linsley, 1967
 Metopotylus Quedenfeldt, 1882
 Millotsaphanidius Lepesme & Breuning, 1956
 Mimoeme Chemsak & Linsley, 1967
 Namiboeme Adlbauer, 2000
 Necydalosaurus Tippmann, 1960
 Neoeme Gounelle, 1909
 Neolygrus Martins, 1980
 Neomarius Fairmaire, 1872
 Nesoeme Linsley & Chemsak, 1966
 Noserius Pascoe, 1857
 Ocroeme Martins, Chemsak & Linsley, 1966
 Oeme Newman, 1840
 Oemodana Gahan, 1904
 Oemospila Gahan, 1906
 Oplatocera White, 1853
 Oxycauloeme Lepesme, 1948
 Paracalybistum Lepesme, 1952
 Parahyphus Gressitt, 1959
 Paramartinsia Martins & Galileo, 2005
 Paranoplium Casey, 1924
 Paratemnopis Martins, 1978
 Paratessaropa Zajciw, 1957
 Parauxesis Aurivillius, 1915
 Paroeme Aurivillius, 1886
 Paulianometallyra Lepesme & Breuning, 1956
 Pelossus Thomson, 1864
 Phrynoeme Martins, 1980
 Placoeme Chemsak & Linsley, 1964
 Proeme Martins, 1978
 Prosopoeme Aurivillius, 1927
 Psathyrioides Breuning & Villiers, 1958
 Pseudomethia Linsley, 1937
 Saphanidus Jordan, 1894
 Senorius Hüdepohl, 1992
 Sepaicutea Lane, 1972
 Sphalloeme Melzer, 1928
 Stenocoptoeme Adlbauer, 2005
 Stenoeme Gounelle, 1909
 Styloxus LeConte, 1873
 Tallyrama Martins, 1980
 Temnopis Audinet-Serville, 1834
 Tessaropa Haldeman, 1847
 Tetraommatus Perroud, 1855
 Trichopsathyrus Breuning, 1958
 Tristachycera Bates, 1872
 Vandykea Linsley, 1932
 Wappesoeme Galileo, Martins & Santos-Silva, 2015
 Xanthoeme Martins, 1980
 Xela (beetle) Botero, Bezark & Santos-Silva, 2020
 Xystrocera Audinet-Serville, 1834
 Xystroceroides Lepesme, 1948
 Yementallyrama Adlbauer, 2007
 Zamioeme Adlbauer, 2012

References

External links
 

Cerambycidae
Xystrocerini
Beetle tribes